Liqiliqini (Aymara liqiliqi, liqi liqi Southern lapwing or Andean lapwing, -ni a suffix to indicate ownership, "the one with the Southern lapwing (or Andean lapwing)", also spelled Lecceleccene, Lejelejene) is a mountain in the northern extensions of the Apolobamba mountain range in the Andes of Peru, about  high. It is located in the Puno Region, Sandia Province, Quiaca District. It lies northeast of a mountain named Wilaquta.

References 

Mountains of Puno Region
Mountains of Peru